The IAU 100 km World Championships have been held annually since 1987, at different locations, and is organized by the International Association of Ultrarunners (IAU). Due to lack of sponsorship, the 2013 event, planned for Jeju Island, South Korea, was cancelled and the 2014 event, originally due to be held at Daugavpils, Latvia, was held instead in Doha, Qatar.

The championships from 2007 to 2012 incorporated the IAU 100 km European Championships.

Editions

Men

Women

Total medals tables

Men

Women

See also
Ultramarathon
International Association of Ultrarunners
IAU 50 km World Championships

References

External links
IAU official site
IAAF reports: 2010, 2011, 2012

100 km
Recurring sporting events established in 1987
Ultramarathons